The Nigerian Medical Association (NMA) is the professional association and registered  for Nigerian doctors and dentists.  The NMA has more than 35,000 members from 36 state branches and the branch from the federal capital territory, including those registered in the diaspora. NMA's membership spans all six major specialties of Internal Medicine, Surgery, Obstetrics and Gynaecology, Paediatrics, Public Health and Laboratory Medicine/Pathology.  The NMA was established in 1951 and is located in Abuja with over 30 branch offices throughout Nigeria.

Distribution of members
The 2006 national census showed a population of about 140 million.  It has been estimated that about 45% of doctors practice in urban areas where only 55% of the population lives.  This creates an unbalanced  doctor-to-population distribution which is one of the challenges of the Nigerian health system that the association and the Federal Government are trying to address.

Governance
The National Executive Council (NEC) is the governing body of the NMA and it has full powers to act on its behalf in the period between the Annual Delegates' Meetings and make policy decisions.

See also
 Healthcare in Nigeria

References

External links
 Nigerian Medical Association

Medical associations based in Nigeria
Organizations established in 1951
Organizations based in Abuja
1951 establishments in Nigeria
Nigeria articles needing expert attention